The 1915 Colgate football team was an American football team that represented Colgate University as an independent during the 1915 college football season. In its fourth season under head coach Laurence Bankart, the team compiled a 5–1 record and outscored opponents by a total of 223 to 38. Earl Abell was the team captain. The team played its home games on Whitnall Field in Hamilton, New York.

Schedule

References

Colgate
Colgate Raiders football seasons
Colgate football